The Greatest Show on Earth  was a British progressive rock band, who recorded two albums for EMI's progressive rock arm, Harvest Records, in 1970, who became known for their European hit "Real Cool World".

The band had been conceived by Harvest Records in an attempt to create a horn-based rock combo, such as Blood Sweat & Tears or Chicago.

The band was also notable for its album covers, designed by the artist group Hipgnosis.

Band members included Norman Watt-Roy and his older brother Garth Watt-Roy, Ozzie Lane, Mick Deacon, Ian Aitcheson, Tex Philpotts, Dick Hanson, Ron Prudence and Colin Horton-Jennings.

Their usual producer was EMI house producer Jonathan Peel, not to be confused with DJ John Peel.

Discography
1970: Horizons
1970: The Going's Easy
1975: The Greatest Show on Earth (compilation of first two albums)

References

Harvest Records artists
British progressive rock groups